Kurdyukova is a rural locality (a village) in Beloyevskoye Rural Settlement, Kudymkarsky District, Perm Krai, Russia. The population was 9 as of 2010.

Geography 
Kurdyukova is located 13 km northwest of Kudymkar (the district's administrative centre) by road. Mosheva and Minyadyn are the nearest rural localities.

References 

Rural localities in Kudymkarsky District